George Southcote (1572–1638), of Shillingford, Devon, was an English politician.

He was a Member (MP) of the Parliament of England for Plympton Erle in 1597.

References

1572 births
1638 deaths
English MPs 1597–1598
Members of the Parliament of England for Plympton Erle
George
Lords of the Manor
Suicides by hanging in England
Suicides in Kensington